George Irving Scott-Moncrieff (9 April 1910 – 11 March 1974) was a Scottish novelist, playwright, poet, journalist, editor, and author of several well-known books on Scotland.

Early life and education

George Scott-Moncrieff was born in Morningside, Edinburgh, the younger son of Rev. Colin William Scott-Moncrieff and Constance Elizabeth Hannah Lunn. He was a nephew of the famous translator C. K. Scott Moncrieff. His elder brother, Colin Herbert (8 November 1908 – November 1941), was killed in action in Libya. He was educated at Edinburgh Academy and Aldenham School in Hertfordshire, England.

Career

Scott-Moncrieff's first novel Café Bar was published in 1932. He married his first wife Ann Shearer in 1936, having met her in London where they both worked as journalists. Under her influence he converted from Episcopalianism to Catholicism. He lived with his first wife in Breakacky near Kingussie, then Dalwhinnie, and finally Edinburgh. After her death at the age of 29, he moved to the Isle of Eigg in 1945 and lived there a hermit-like existence in a simple cottage for about five years. His novel Death's Bright Shadow (1948) is a fictional account of his grief. He moved back to Edinburgh in 1951 and eventually married Eileen née Ward, only daughter of the American illustrator Keith Ward. Upon his death he was survived by Eileen and seven children from the two marriages.

The defence of tradition runs through all of Scott-Moncrieff's writings – his books about Scottish architecture and Scottish religions, his plays, his novels, his poems, his short history of the Catholic faith in Scotland, his many book reviews, his moving little volume of religious meditations.  He coined the term "Balmorality" to describe the cultural manifestations of Scotland's accommodation with the British Empire. In 1951, he wrote Living Traditions of Scotland, a booklet published on behalf of the Council of Industrial Design Scottish Committee to accompany the Living Traditions exhibition of architecture and crafts held in Edinburgh as part of the Festival of Britain.

He died in Peeblesshire and is buried in Traquair Churchyard.

Selected publications

 15 editions published between 1939 and 1983

 42 editions published between 1947 and 1967

 13 editions published between 1960 and 1961

 s.d., 25th ed.
as editor:

 11 editions published between 1938 and 1983

References

1910 births
1974 deaths
People educated at Aldenham School
People educated at Edinburgh Academy
Scottish journalists
Scottish novelists
Scottish Renaissance